Sally Jane Griffiths (born 9 April 1963) in an Australian former cricketer who played as an all-rounder, batting right-handed and bowling right-arm pace. She appeared in 7 Test matches and 32 One Day Internationals for Australia between 1985 and 1995. She scored one Test match century, against New Zealand in January 1990, and scored 309 runs and took 17 wickets at an average of 20.05 in ODIs. She played domestic cricket for New South Wales.

In April 2022, in recognition of her outstanding service to New South Wales as a player, Griffiths was inducted into the Cricket NSW Hall of Fame.

References

External links
 
 
 Sally Griffiths at southernstars.org.au

1963 births
Living people
Cricketers from Newcastle, New South Wales
Australia women Test cricketers
Australia women One Day International cricketers
New South Wales Breakers cricketers